Niccola Paracciani Clarelli (12 April 1799 – 7 July 1872) was a Catholic Cardinal and was Arch-Priest of St. Peter's Basilica at the Vatican.

He was also Camerlengo of the Sacred College of Cardinals, Prefect of the Congregation for Bishops and Secretary of the Roman Curia.

Biography
Paracciani was born on 12 April 1799 in Rieti. He was educated at the Archgymnasium of Rome where he received a doctorate in utroque iuris, both civil and canon law on 8 July 1822.

While completing his education, he was ordained a priest on 1 June 1822 at age 23. He then attended the Pontifical Academy of Ecclesiastical Nobles to study diplomacy. He spent time as the privy chamberlain to Pope Pius VII in 1819.

On 22 January 1844 he was appointed Bishop of Montefiascone and that same day raised to the rank of cardinal of the order of cardinal priests and on 25 January assigned the titular church of San Pietro in Vincoli. He received his episcopal consecration at the patriarchal Vatican Basilica from Pope Gregory XVI on 11 February. He resigned as bishop of Montefiascone in 1854.

In 1860, Paracciani was appointed secretary of the Congregation for the Erection of Churches and Consistorial Provisions, the equivalent of the modern role of Prefect of the Congregation for Bishops.

In 1863, he was appointed Camerlengo of the Sacred College of Cardinals and Secretary of the Roman Curia. He was appointed cardinal bishop of Frascati on 22 February 1867 and in 1870 was appointed Archpriest of St. Peter's Basilica. Clarelli participated in the Papal Conclave of 1846 that elected Pope Pius IX and in the First Vatican Council in 1869 and 1870.

Paracciani died on 7 July 1872 at Vico Equense and was temporarily buried there.

Notes

References

External links
 
 

1799 births
1872 deaths
19th-century Italian cardinals
Cardinal-bishops of Frascati
Cardinals created by Pope Gregory XVI
People from Rieti
Pontifical Ecclesiastical Academy alumni
Members of the Sacred Consistorial Congregation
Bishops of Montefiascone